Norwegian, Norwayan, or Norsk may refer to:
Something of, from, or related to Norway, a country in northwestern Europe
Norwegians, both a nation and an ethnic group native to Norway
Demographics of Norway
The Norwegian language, including the two official written forms:
Bokmål, literally "book language", used by 85–90% of the population of Norway
Nynorsk, literally "New Norwegian", used by 10–15% of the population of Norway
The Norwegian Sea

Norwegian or  may also refer to:

Norwegian

Norwegian Air Shuttle, an airline, trading as Norwegian
Norwegian Long Haul, a defunct subsidiary of Norwegian Air Shuttle, flying long-haul flights
Norwegian Air Lines, a former airline, merged with Scandinavian Airlines in 1951 
Norwegian coupling, used for narrow-gauge railways
Norwegian Cruise Line, a cruise line
Norwegian Elkhound, a canine breed.
Norwegian Forest cat, a domestic feline breed
Norwegian Red, a breed of dairy cattle
Norwegian Township, Schuylkill County, Pennsylvania, USA

Norsk

Norsk (marque), a Norwegian brand of cars
Norsk (rural locality), a rural locality in Russia

See also
Norway (disambiguation)
Norge (disambiguation)

Language and nationality disambiguation pages